Golem is a one-act opera by Nicolae Bretan to his own libretto, based on the legend of the Golem as expressed in a drama by . It was written over a brief period in 1923, and was first performed on 23 December 1924 at the Hungarian Opera, Cluj.

Roles

Instrumentation
The opera is scored for the following instruments:
 3 flutes (piccolo), 2 oboes, English horn, 2 clarinets, bass clarinet, 2 bassoons
 4 horns, 3 trumpets, 3 trombones, tuba
 timpani, percussion
 strings
In 2018 the opera was arranged for chamber orchestra by Tobias Schwencke for a production at Neuköllner Oper, Berlin.

Synopsis
Prague in the 16th century. Rabbi Lőw (based on the historical figure), has created the Golem, a living creature, from clay. The Golem falls in love with the Rabbi's granddaughter, thereby infecting her with a fatal illness. The Rabbi destroys the Golem to save his granddaughter.

Recording
 Moldova Philharmonic Orchestra, cond. Cristian Mandeal. Nimbus Records NI5424 (1987).

References

1923 operas
Golem
Romanian-language operas
Operas
Operas by Nicolae Bretan